Lloyd Dirk Greeff (born 3 January 1994) is a South African rugby union player who last played for the  in the Pro14, the  in the Currie Cup and the  in the Rugby Challenge. He can play as a winger or a centre.

Rugby career

Youth / Golden Lions

Greeff was born in Vanderbijlpark. He scored two tries in their 61–5 victory over Scotland, another in a 33–24 victory over the hosts and also played in their semi-final victory over New Zealand.

He joined the Johannesburg-based , but suffered a knee injury that ruled him out of action for the majority of his Lions career.

Zebre

Greeff moved to Italy to join Pro12 side Zebre before the 2016–2017 season.

References

South African rugby union players
Living people
1994 births
People from Vanderbijlpark
Rugby union centres
Rugby union wings
Golden Lions players
South Africa Under-20 international rugby union players
Rugby union players from Gauteng
Zebre Parma players
Free State Cheetahs players
Cheetahs (rugby union) players